Acroclita is a genus of moths belonging to the subfamily Olethreutinae of the family Tortricidae. The genus was described by Julius Lederer in 1859.

Species
Acroclita altivaga Meyrick, 1926
Acroclita anelpista Diakonoff & Wolff, 1976
Acroclita belinda Meyrick, 1912
Acroclita bryomorpha Meyrick, 1931
Acroclita bryopa Meyrick, 1911
Acroclita catharotorna Meyrick, in Caradja & Meyrick, 1935
Acroclita causterias Meyrick, 1927
Acroclita cheradota Meyrick, 1912
Acroclita clarissa Meyrick, 1921
Acroclita convergens Meyrick, in de Joannis, 1930
Acroclita cryptiolitha T. B. Fletcher, 1940
Acroclita discariana Philpott, 1930
Acroclita elaeagnivora Oku, 1979
Acroclita esmeralda Meyrick, 1912
Acroclita euphylla Meyrick, 1926
Acroclita furculana Kuznetzov, in Kuznetzov, Kaila & Mikkola, 1996
Acroclita guanchana Walsingham, 1907
Acroclita gumicola Oku, 1979
Acroclita hercoptila Meyrick, 1927
Acroclita klimeschi Diakonoff, 1985
Acroclita lithoxoa Diakonoff, 1950
Acroclita loxoplecta Meyrick, in Caradja & Meyrick, 1935
Acroclita macrotoma Turner, 1918
Acroclita madens Meyrick, 1921
Acroclita notophthalma Meyrick, 1933
Acroclita paulina Meyrick, 1925
Acroclita pertracta Diakonoff, 1989
Acroclita posterovenata Razowski, 2009
Acroclita prasinissa Meyrick, 1921
Acroclita scatebrosa Meyrick, 1912
Acroclita sonchana Walsingham, 1907
Acroclita stenoglypha Diakonoff, 1971
Acroclita subsequana (Herrich-Schffer, 1851)
Acroclita trachynota Meyrick, 1926
Acroclita trichocnemis Meyrick, 1914
Acroclita trimaelena Meyrick, 1922
Acroclita vigescens Meyrick, 1920

See also
List of Tortricidae genera

References

External links
Tortricidae.com

Eucosmini
Tortricidae genera
Taxa named by Julius Lederer